Typocerus velutinus, known generally as the banded longhorn or cerambycid beetle, is a species of flower longhorn in the family of beetles known as Cerambycidae. It is found in North America.

Subspecies
These two subspecies belong to the species Typocerus velutinus:
 Typocerus velutinus nobilis (Newman, 1841) i c g b
 Typocerus velutinus velutinus (Olivier, 1795) i
Data sources: i = ITIS, c = Catalogue of Life, g = GBIF, b = Bugguide.net

References

Further reading

External links

 

Lepturinae
Articles created by Qbugbot
Beetles described in 1795